"Tennessee River" is a song written by Randy Owen, and recorded by American country music band Alabama, of which Owen is the lead vocalist. It was recorded in April 1980 as the third single from the album My Home's in Alabama.  The song was the group's first No. 1 song on the Billboard magazine Hot Country Singles chart.

Song history
The song was officially Alabama's first single release by RCA Nashville after they had signed with the label in March 1980. The song is part of the band's first RCA album, My Home's in Alabama, which also includes two earlier singles: "I Wanna Come Over" and the title track; the earlier songs had originally been released by the small MDJ Records, even though there were later RCA pressings of "My Home's in Alabama" offered for retail sale and "I Wanna Come Over" was included as a B-side for their next single release, "Why Lady Why."

A fiddle-heavy celebration of growing up near the Tennessee River (which flows fairly close to Alabama's home base of Fort Payne), the song expresses the regrets of having gotten the urge to roam, gratitude of the few times the singer gets to enjoy spending time by the river, and a desire to eventually settle down and raise a family in the river's vicinity.

Country music historian Bill Malone, in his essay included in the liner notes for Classic Country Music: A Smithsonian Collection, noted that "Tennessee River" was among those songs where they "exhibit a deep love for their state and region ... and in the unpretentious sense of place and loyalty to home and family that they display in their personal lives and performances." Other songs in their repertoire - including 
"My Home's in Alabama," "Song of the South" and "Born Country," plus their Christmas song "Christmas in Dixie" - would exhibit those same sentiments. The Billboard editors praised the composition, noting the powerful instrumental parts and identifiable vocal.

"Tennessee River" began Alabama's string of 21 consecutive No. 1 singles in as many releases, a string that spanned from 1980 through 1987 and is generally considered not to include the 1982 Christmas song, "Christmas in Dixie".

Alternate versions
The band originally cut a version over 5 minutes in duration for their independent release, ALABAMA BAND #3.  When the band moved from MDJ records to RCA, the label demanded that the "original" second verse in the song be dropped, so the band and producer Harold Shedd quickly cut a new version with session musicians and released the single a month later.  When performing live, the band always plays their original arrangement, complete with the second verse. Jeff Cook commonly plays one part of the added guitar solo with his teeth. A live version with the extra verse is included on Alabama's first greatest hits album, while the commercially released studio version is available on their third.

Charts

Year-end charts

References

Works cited
Malone, Bill, "Classic Country Music: A Smithsonian Collection" (booklet included with  Classic Country Music: A Smithsonian Collection 4-disc set). Smithsonian Institution, 1990.
Morris, Edward, "Alabama," Contemporary Books Inc., Chicago, 1985

External links
Allmusic — Tennessee River by Alabama 

1980 singles
1980 songs
Alabama (American band) songs
Song recordings produced by Harold Shedd
RCA Records singles
Songs written by Randy Owen
Songs about Tennessee
Songs about rivers